Smrjene (in older sources Smrjane or Smerjenje) is a settlement in the hills south of Pijava Gorica in the Municipality of Škofljica in central Slovenia. It is made up of three hamlets: Brezje, Rupnice, and Smrjene. The municipality is part of the traditional region of Lower Carniola and is now included in the Central Slovenia Statistical Region.

References

External links

Smrjene on Geopedia

Populated places in the Municipality of Škofljica